John Martin (c. 1814 – 9 July 1876) was a schoolmaster in Adelaide, South Australia.

History
John Martin arrived in South Australia sometime before 1850, and settled at Tungkillo where he served as a catechist and school master, then founded the Angas Street Academy in Adelaide in 1852.
By the end of that year the school was conducted in Pirie Street where it continued to 1856.

John Martin ran the Fellenberg Commercial School on Pulteney Street from 1859, then on Hindmarsh Square from 1861.

He was universally regarded as an excellent teacher and a stern disciplinarian, but his use of the cane seems excessive, even for those days:
"I remember that school well," said Mr. Wright, and he smiled ruefully. "The master believed that the cane should play a big part in the education of the child, and he was a perfect artist in applying it. He reduced flogging to a science, and I believe he really experienced a savage joy in whacking his pupils. I remember we used to play marbles in front of the Pirie-street Church during the dinner hour . . . woe betide anyone who fired a marble after the bell went or who failed to grab his marbles and run for the school. He was marked for a caning, and when he came in all whom he had picked out would be ranged round the desk in a semi-circle, while he got down his weapon of torture, and went round and round that semi-circle until he was utterly exhausted. It was positively cruel the way he punished some of the boys. I remember one of the boys had a stubborn temper and would not cry, and he made him place his hand on the desk and slammed away at it until he cut it to pieces. There was trouble over that, but I forget what the result was. Those of us who did not give satisfaction in our lessons during the day were marched down to his house — a two-storey house, that is still standing, just before you come to the Brecknock Hotel. I remember one day we were marching down there, and old Martin was stumping along behind us. He had a cork leg. We had just turned round the Supreme Court corner, and he was a few yards behind, when we made a dash for it and disappeared. It was worth anything to see his face when he came round the corner and there was not a boy in sight. But we suffered for it next day. Notwithstanding the fearful punishment we received then, however, we did it again another night. He marched down to his place and put us in a shed in the yard, telling us to stay there until he had had his dinner, when he would come out and hear our lessons. But we cleared over the back wall. We caught it next day, I can tell you. Those were the times in which we went to school, and I am glad it has all changed now."

He developed a novel blasting compound, for which he claimed a patent, founded the "Australian Patent Blasting Compound Company" to be manufactured in Melbourne, and left for that city at the end of 1864. A patent was applied for in Victoria in late 1865.
He may have been living in South Yarra when his company was awarded £25 premium for initiating a new industry to the colony. No more was heard of his company or the product.
He settled with his family in Pentland Hills, Victoria, near Myrniong, where he taught at the local school. 
He died in Melbourne after a few weeks' illness. His remains were buried in the Melbourne General Cemetery.

His successor at the Fellenberg School in 1865 was James Morecott Holder ( – 1 November 1887). The school closed in 1866.

Family
Martin was married and had a small family; about whom few details are available. One W. Martin was present at the tests of his blasting compound and one Thomas Martin was a director of the company the following year, 

He had no known family connection with Annie Montgomerie Martin, who ran Miss Martin's School on Flinders Street, Adelaide from 1870 to 1874, but a relationship to Allen Martin who had a school at Port Adelaide cannot be ruled out.

Notable students
A. M. Simpson

References 

1814 births
1876 deaths
Australian headmasters